Baharly (formerly Quşçubaba) or Moshkhmhat is a village in the Khojaly District of Azerbaijan, in the disputed region of Nagorno-Karabakh. The village had an ethnic Armenian-majority population prior to the 2020 Nagorno-Karabakh war, and also had an Armenian majority in 1989.

History 
During the Soviet period, the village was part of the Askeran District of the Nagorno-Karabakh Autonomous Oblast. After the First Nagorno-Karabakh War, the village was administrated as part of the Askeran Province of the breakaway Republic of Artsakh. The village was captured by Azerbaijan on 7 November 2020, during the 2020 Nagorno-Karabakh war.

Historical heritage sites 
Historical heritage sites in and around the village include the monastery of Ghevondyats Anapat (also known as the monastery of Ghondik) from between the 5th and 19th centuries, a 12th/13th-century khachkar, a 17th-century spring monument, a 17th/18th-century bridge, a 19th-century cemetery, a 19th-century watermill, and the 19th-century church of Surb Astvatsatsin.

Demographics 
The village had 61 inhabitants in 2005, and 64 inhabitants in 2015.

References

External links 
 

Populated places in Khojaly District
Nagorno-Karabakh